Pink Mammoth is the third EP by Chicago-based instrumental metal band Pelican, released in 2007 by Hydra Head Records.

The title track is a major key version of "Mammoth" from Pelican's debut EP, and the b-side "End of Seasons" is a remix/mashup from Prefuse 73 of "Aurora Borealis" and the untitled track from The Fire in Our Throats Will Beckon the Thaw.

Track listing
 "Pink Mammoth" – 6:28
 "End of Seasons (Prefuse 73 remix)" – 8:33

Pelican (band) albums
2007 EPs
Hydra Head Records EPs